Adam Ignacy Zabellewicz (1784–1831) was a professor of philosophy at Warsaw University.

Life
Zabellewicz was professor of philosophy at Warsaw University from 1818 to 1823.

Zabellewicz was one of nearly all the university professors of philosophy in Poland before the November 1830–31 Uprising who held a position that shunned both Positivism and metaphysical speculation, affined to the Scottish philosophers but linked in certain respects to Kantian critique.

See also
History of philosophy in Poland
List of Poles

Notes

References
Władysław Tatarkiewicz, Zarys dziejów filozofii w Polsce (A Brief History of Philosophy in Poland), [in the series:] Historia nauki polskiej w monografiach (History of Polish Learning in Monographs), [volume] XXXII, Kraków, Polska Akademia Umiejętności (Polish Academy of Learning), 1948. This monograph draws from pertinent sections in earlier editions of the author's Historia filozofii (History of Philosophy).

1784 births
1831 deaths
19th-century Polish philosophers